Anthony Leslie Bastable (15 October 1944 – 29 May 2007) was an English television presenter, who was one of the original presenters of the children's magazine programme Magpie.

Early life
Bastable was born in Hexham, Northumberland, in 1944. After moving to Wembley, Middlesex, he attended Wembley Manor School from 1952 to 1955 and University College School in Frognal, London. 

On leaving school he trained to be a school teacher, teaching British History part-time at Buckingham College School in Harrow, Middlesex, whilst also working as a reporter for local newspapers.

Television career
In the early 1960s, Bastable applied for a job as a television news reporter for Southern Television, but was turned down for being "too young". Instead he was given a job presenting a children's programme. Within 18 months he was working for ATV as a presenter of children's shows, sports magazines and schools' programmes. In 1968 he moved to Thames Television and began presenting Magpie, a new children's programme, with Susan Stranks and Pete Brady. Magpie was effectively a "groovier" version of the BBC's Blue Peter. In 1972, he became Magpie'''s producer. 

During his career, Bastable produced and presented many one-off programmes, including historical documentaries and current affairs programmes, and presented and commentated on many outside and sporting events. He presented two series of Problems (1976-77), a programme on sexual difficulties, screened late, and with Claire Rayner in the first series, and Jenny Conway and Paul Brown for the entire run. For Thames he presented the Drive-In programme with Shaw Taylor from 1973 to 1978, and also its successor Wheels from 1980 to 1981. In 1976 he presented Miss Thames Television; he also wrote and presented 1776, the ITV programme on the US bicentenary, and he provided the commentaries for the award-winning historical series English Garden, which were delivered by Sir John Gielgud. For nine years Bastable presented the consumer protection series Money-Go-Round, and also presented shows such as Mind Over Matter, a programme he devised with Kit Pedler that investigated the paranormal, and the computing series Database as well as 4 Computer Buffs. In addition, he was a panellist on radio shows and he narrated the Channel 4 nature programme Profiles Of Nature.

Later life
Bastable later moved into independent production, and he produced training and promotional films for companies such as the Ford Motor Company, the National Bus Company, the Royal Navy, the Department of Transport and the Institute of Advanced Motorists. He also authored mini-history books for children on the 15th and 16th-century nautical explorers John Cabot and Ferdinand Magellan.

Personal life
Bastable was a qualified cricket umpire and founded the Institute of Cricket Umpires and Scorers. In 1972 he founded The Magpies, a wandering cricket team taking its name from the TV programme. 

He married three times. His first marriage was in 1969 to June Buchan, from whom he was divorced in 1971. In 1974, he married Jackie Colkett. They had a daughter, but divorced in 1992. He married for the third time, to Anita Westwood, in 2001.

Death
He suffered from emphysema in his final years, and died at the age of 62 from pneumonia at the East Surrey Hospital, Redhill, in the county of Surrey on 29 May 2007.

Popular culture references
Half Man Half Biscuit refer to Bastable in their song "I Love You Because (You Look Like Jim Reeves)", from the 1985 album Back in the DHSS. He is also referenced in the song "Tony Bastable vs. John Noakes" by The Dentists, from the 1985 album Some People Are on the Pitch They Think It's All Over It Is Now.

PublicationsJohn Cabot (Pub. World Almanac Library, 2003).Ferdinand Magellan'' (Pub. World Almanac Library, 2003).

References

External links

1944 births
2007 deaths
English biographers
English children's writers
English television presenters
English television producers
People educated at University College School
People from Hexham
Deaths from pneumonia in England
20th-century biographers